is a Japanese one-shot  manga written and illustrated by Junichi Yamakawa. The short story is a famous meme on the Internet (especially on Japanese Internet forums). It is largely considered the representative work of Yamakawa and responsible for the revived popularity of his manga.

Etymology
Some translate the title as meaning "Poop Soup Technique". "Kuso" (くそ) means "crap", though the word is often used simply as interjection. Miso is actually a kind of seasoning used in miso soup.

Kuso Miso figuratively meaning "mess, muddle", a state where one cannot tell the difference between brown miso paste and feces.

Plot
Masaki Michishita, a "typical guy" enrolled in preparatory school, is running to the park washroom when he spots a man wearing a jumpsuit sitting on a nearby bench. The man, Takakazu Abe, unzips his jumpsuit and exposes his penis, asking Masaki, . They proceed to the washroom to sexual intercourse.

When Abe performs fellatio on Michishita, the latter cannot hold his bladder and accidentally urinates in Abe's mouth. Abe suggests that Michishita empty his bladder in Abe during anal sex, and Michishita does so. When it is Michishita's turn to be on the receiving end, he defecates on Abe's penis, much to the dismay of Abe and the embarrassment of a middle-aged man walking by.

Characters
 
 A prep school student with no prior sexual experience with men, though he often fantasizes about them. He is strongly attracted to Takakazu Abe at first sight, prompting him to think, .

 
 An auto mechanic. In the story, he sits provocatively on a park bench looking for sex. He is well-endowed and an experienced sexual partner.

Impact

Interest in this manga outside of homoerotica circles sparked more than ten years after its first publication, as it was illegally posted on Ayashii World in 2002. There, the manga gained some interest for its surreal depiction of gay men and its cheesy storyline.

In March 2003, pages of the manga were posted on Futaba Channel, triggering the so-called "Yamajun boom" of interest in Junichi Yamakawa's works. At the same time, Shift_JIS art of the manga produced on 2channel also contributed to the boom. Since then, lines from the manga such as "uho! ii otoko" and "yaranai ka" became known as the "Yamajun language", which became popular Internet slang. On Japanese forums and imageboards, as well as in homosexual circles, the interjection "uho!", along with other lines from his manga, is often taken in a homoerotic context for the above reason. "Yaranaika" itself was ranked the 16th in 2007's "Net Slang of the Year" in Japan. Parody art of the manga, usually achieved by photoshopping the characters' expressions of pleasure onto other images, are often seen at various imageboards. Similarly, Takakazu Abe makes several (unnamed) comic-relief cameos in the hentai manga Alignment You! You!, saying his famous line in most of them. The manga was also referenced in the 2012 anime series Joshiraku.

A theme song ("Yaranaika") has also been attributed to Takakazu Abe, using homoerotic lyrics to the melody of "Balalaika", a song by Morning Musume member Koharu Kusumi. Yuichiro Nagashima, the cosplay kickboxer, once entered the ring in Abe's eponymous jumpsuit with the parody song as background music. The song remains popular on video sites such as Nico Nico Douga, where it has been integrated into one of the site's most popular medleys.

In 2009, in a survey asking its respondents "which manga do you think is the most interesting?" in a pool of 6000, Kuso Miso Technique came at 11th, beating popular manga such as Gin Tama and Case Closed.

Japanese pornography maker Moodyz released a live-action adaptation in 2012, describing it as a collaboration work with Junichi Yamakawa and a "pinnacle of  anal". Female porn stars were cast as the characters Takakazu Abe and Masaki Michishita, despite the characters referring to themselves as male in the adult video.

In 2014, American manga publishing firm Digital Manga Publishing created an April Fools' joke where they claimed that their pornographic label Project-H would release Kuso Miso Technique in English.

References

See also

1987 manga
1980s LGBT literature
Hentai anime and manga
Internet memes introduced in 2002
LGBT in anime and manga
One-shot manga
Works published under a pseudonym